Dave Stewart is a colorist working in the comics industry.

Work and recognition
Stewart is known for his work at Dark Horse Comics, DC Comics, and Marvel Comics, as well as coloring Tim Sale's art in Heroes. 

He has been recognized for his work with the Eisner Award for Coloring in 2003, 2005, 2007–2011, 2013, 2015, and 2020.

Bibliography 
Comics work (colours unless specified) includes:

Dark Horse Comics 
Mike Mignola's Hellboy, B.P.R.D., Abe Sapien, Lobster Johnson, Witchfinder, Sledgehammer 44, Baltimore, and The Amazing Screw-On Head
Gerard Way's The Umbrella Academy
Conan
Michael Chabon's The Amazing Adventures of The Escapist
Joss Whedon's Fray
Numerous Star Wars comics
Eric Powell's The Goon
Let Me In: Crossroads
Brian Wood's The Massive (#1–9,#14–present)
Geof Darrow's Shaolin Cowboy

DC Comics 
Darwyn Cooke's DC: The New Frontier
Jeph Loeb and Tim Sale's Catwoman: When in Rome
Brian Azzarello and Lee Bermejo's Lex Luthor: Man of Steel
Detective Comics written by Greg Rucka #854-860
Superman written by Kurt Busiek and pencilled by Carlos Pacheco
Fábio Moon and Gabriel Bá's Daytripper
Sean Murphy's Batman: Beyond the White Knight

Image Comics 
The Walking Dead covers #115–present

Marvel Comics 
Captain America #1–9, 17–20 (2002–2004)
Daredevil Vol. 2 #66–81 (2004–2006)
Ultimate Fantastic Four #1–18 (2004–2005)
Ultimate X-Men – various issues, 2001–2004
Union Jack (1998–99)
Iron Man: Enter the Mandarin (2007–2008)

Television 
Isaac Mendez' precognitive art on NBC's Heroes (which itself is drawn by Tim Sale)

Wildstorm 
Silent Dragon (2005)

References 

Dave Stewart at Dark Horse Comics

External links 
Dave Stewart at Dragon Monkey Studios

Year of birth missing (living people)
Living people
Comics colorists
Eisner Award winners for Best Coloring
Harvey Award winners for Best Colorist